Sharabi is a 1964 Hindi-language drama film directed by Raj Rishi and starring Madhubala and Dev Anand. The film tells the story of a man and his obsession with alcohol. Sharabi was a commercial success and one of the top-grossing films of 1964. For Madhubala, although the film released five years before her death, it was her final release in her lifetime.

Plot 
Kamala and Keshav are in love and want to marry, but his excessive drinking habit and carelessness has caused his father's demise and makes Kamala's father to postpone their marriage. On the day of his father's death, Keshav vows not to drink again. All are happy. After seeing a change in Keshav, Kamala's father fixed their marriage. But three days before their marriage, Keshav have a stomach ache. He goes to a medicine shop. The shopkeeper doesn't have any empty bottle, but he finds an empty rum bottle in which he gives him the medicine. On the way to home, he meets Kamla. When they were busy in love, two drunkard steals his bottle but he gets his bottle back. But the bottles gets somehow changed.

One day, when he again had stomach ache, he opens that bottle; he knows that its not medicine but a drink. He can't resist and drinks it. When everyone becomes aware, his marriage is cancelled again. They go to another city and Keshav takes to excessive drinking. Kamla's father dies and she has no option than to go to Keshav's house. But Keshav doesn't welcome her and continues drinking. Once in drinking state, he puts fire in a coal mine where his mother also works. His mother loses her both feet and he is sent to jail. Kamla waits for him to return.

Cast 
 Madhubala as Kamala
 Dev Anand as Keshav
 Lalita Pawar as Keshav's mother
 Daisy Irani as Munni
 Badri Prasad as Laxmi Das

Production 
Most of the shooting of Sharabi was completed in 1958, and it was slated to release in late 1958. Madhubala fell sick during the filming and thus the shooting came to a halt. Following temporary recovery, she went to London along with her husband Kishore Kumar for her treatment, the film still incomplete. She finished her work in Sharabi in early 1964.

Soundtrack 
The soundtrack of Sharabi was composed by Madan Mohan and lyrics were penned by Rajendra Krishan.

Box office 
As per Box office India, Sharabi was the eighteenth highest-grossing film of 1964, earning 4 million with profits of 2.4 million.

Location of shooting
Some part of Sharabi film shooted at bhowra colliery JHARIA dhanbad in the shop of kedarnath pannalal aabhushan shop.

References

External links 

1964 films
Films about alcohol
1960s Hindi-language films